Hong Kong Basic Law Article 23 is an article in the Basic Law, the constitution of Hong Kong. It states that Hong Kong "shall enact laws on its own to prohibit any act of treason, secession, sedition, subversion against the Central People's Government, or theft of state secrets, to prohibit foreign political organizations or bodies from conducting political activities in the Region, and to prohibit political organizations or bodies of the Region from establishing ties with foreign political organizations or bodies."

Attempts to implement the article and create the Hong Kong national security law have seen protests, particularly in 2003 and 2019. In 2020, the mainland National People's Congress imposed a security law on Hong Kong under Article 18 of the Basic Law.

Content
Article 23 of the Basic Law (BL 23) states:

Background
Article 23 had undergone significant revisions before the promulgation of its current form on 4 April 1990. The 1987 version of art.23 (Article 22 in 1987) was much shorter and only required that the

The 1989 February version of art.23 only contained the first half of the enacted version, with identical wording with the promulgated version up to the phrase “or theft of state secrets”. The consultative committee noted views that art.23 might affect the freedom of Hong Kong people. It also noted the view that the provision was against the Sino-British Joint Declaration since “it is generally held that the capitalist system is anti-communist and will undermine national unity and subvert the Central People's Government”. 

Similar laws had been in force during the British colonial period, but they had not been strictly enforced since 1945. The Emergency Regulations Ordinance (ERO) from the colonial period remains in force, but in 2019 the Court of First Instance ruled that it was "not compatible with the constitutional order laid down by the Basic Law" due to its unchecked and wide scope. The Court of Appeal later varied this by permitting the Prohibition on Face Covering Regulation as reasonable and valid, but stated ERO regulations were "subject to judicial scrutiny."

Before 1997, the British colonial government introduced the Crimes (Amendment)(No.2) Bill 1996 in an attempt to concretise the concepts of "subversion" and "secession" by confining them to actual violent conduct but of no avail. The bill was voted down in the elected Legislative Council of Hong Kong amid opposition from Beijing and thus left a vacuum in the present legislation.

2003 National Security Bill

Mainland national security laws do not apply in Hong Kong, by virtue of Article 18 of the Basic Law. As a result, there has been steady pressure from CPG on the HKSAR government to meet its obligations under art.23. Laws for the purposes of this Article were introduced by the Tung administration in late 2002.  In February 2003, the HKSAR government proposed the National Security (Legislative Provisions) Bill 2003 to the Legislative Council which aimed to amend the Crimes Ordinance, the Official Secrets Ordinance and the Societies Ordinance pursuant to the obligation imposed by Article 23 of the Basic Law of the Hong Kong Special Administrative Region of the People's Republic of China and to provide for related, incidental and consequential amendments. The proposed bill caused considerable controversy in Hong Kong and a massive demonstration on 1 July 2003. In the aftermath, Liberal Party chairman James Tien resigned from the Executive Council and the bill was withdrawn after it became clear that it would not get the necessary support from the Legislative Council for it to be passed. The bill was then shelved indefinitely.

After 2003
There were calls for reintroducing the national security bill after the 2003 setbacks from the pro-Beijing camp occasionally. After the Beijing interpretation of the Basic Law in November 2016 over the Legislative Council oath-taking controversy to eject two pro-independence legislators from the legislature on the basis that "[Beijing] will absolutely neither permit anyone advocating secession in Hong Kong nor allow any pro-independence activists to enter a government institution," Chief executive Leung Chun-ying said Hong Kong would enact Article 23 targeting the pro-independence movement in Hong Kong.

The Director of the Liaison Office of the Central People's Government in Hong Kong Wang Zhimin accused pro-independence activists of "engaging in activities that sought to separate the motherland and subvert the national regime" and urged the Hong Kong government to enact national security legislation as he said "Hong Kong is the only place in the world without a national security legislation – it’s a major weakness in the nation’s overall security, and it has a direct impact on residents." Wang said without a national security law, "Hong Kong independence radicals have been challenging national sovereignty and security in recent years".

Protests in 2019 and imposition of security law in 2020 
The 2019–20 Hong Kong protests led to an increasing desire within some pro-Beijing lawmakers for Hong Kong to legislate Article 23 of the Basic Law. On 21 May 2020, the Chinese Government proposed a new law on national security regulations that may be enacted in Hong Kong under the provisions of Annex III of its Basic law.  It may set up the legal framework to prevent and punish subversion, terrorism, separatism and foreign interference. The following day, a dozen pan-democrat lawmakers marched to the Chinese Liaison Office to show their disapproval.

On 30 June 2020, the mainland 13th National People's Congress and Standing Committee of the National People's Congress imposed the Hong Kong national security law covering secession and subversion under Article 18 of the Basic Law. The areas of treason, sedition and theft of state secrets are not covered by the new Article 18 law, and remain to be implemented under Article 23 by the Hong Kong SAR. On 12 January 2022, Chief Executive Carrie Lam announced at the first session of the new legislature that new "local legislation" would be created to meet the requirements of Article 23.

John Lee administration 
On 12 April 2022, John Lee stated that implementing security legislation under Article 23 of the Basic Law would be a top priority for him. Lee later said in July 2022 that he preferred not to rush the law, which some saw as backtracking on his election pledge. The legislation was put on the back burner and was not scheduled for Legislative Council discussion in 2022.

In January 2023, after meeting with Xia Baolong, who asked that the Lee administration revise local legislation to keep it aligned with the national security law, Lee said that he would once again prioritize legislation under Article 23 as soon as possible.

See also
Hong Kong national security law
Internet Article 23
Macau security law
Hong Kong 1 July marches
Hong Kong independence
Turkey's Article 301

References

External links
Hong Kong Government website on Article 23
July - documentary film on the 2003 Hong Kong July 1 march, by Tammy Cheung
Macau Government website on Article 23 of the Macau Basic Law

Hong Kong Basic Law
Human rights in Hong Kong